Forlorn River is a 1937 American Western film directed by Charles Barton and starring Buster Crabbe, June Martel, and Harvey Stephens. Based on the novel by Zane Grey, the film is about a cowboy name Nevada who takes a job on a ranch rounding up horses. He comes into conflict with a powerful cattleman and former bankrobber.

Cast
 Buster Crabbe as Jim Lacey aka Nevada
 June Martel as Ina Blaine
 Harvey Stephens as Les Setter
 John Patterson as Ben Ide
 Syd Saylor as "Weary" Pierce
 William Duncan as Blaine
 Ray Bennett as Henchman Bill
 Ruth Warren as Millie the cook
 Lew Kelly as Sheriff Jim Henry
 Chester Conklin as Sheriff Alec Grundy
 Barlowe Borland as "Dad", the Bank Cashier
 Larry Lawrence as Ed
 Lee Powell as Henchman Duke
 Oscar 'Dutch' Hendrian as Sam

External links

1937 films
1937 Western (genre) films
Films based on works by Zane Grey
American Western (genre) films
American black-and-white films
1930s English-language films
Films based on American novels
Paramount Pictures films
Films directed by Charles Barton
1930s American films